Suraapanam is a 2022 Indian Telugu-language fantasy comedy film written and directed by Sampath Kumar. The film is produced by Matta Madhu Yadav under the banner Akhil Bhavya Creations. It Stars Sampath Kumar, Pragna Nayan, Ajay Ghosh, Surya, Fish Venkat, Laxman Meesala, Chammak Chandra play important roles. The music is composed by Bheems Ceciroleo and the cinematography by Vijay Tagore. Suraapanam was released theatrically on 10 June 2022.

Cast 

 Sampath Kumar (Mamidi Shiva)
 Pragya Nayan (Parvati)
 Ajay Ghosh (Mallanna)
 Surya (Shiva)
 Fish Venkat
 Lakshman Meesala (Google)
 Chammak Chandra (Wolf Rambabu)
 Vidyasagar (John)
 Anjibabu (Anjanna)
 Giri Potaraju (Quarter)
 Master Akhil (Shiva)
 Surabhi Prabhavathi
 Tripura
 Sujatha Dikshith
 Koteshwara Rao (Nagaraju)
 Jenny (Priest)
 Saikiran Yadav
 Zabardast Rajamouli
 Uvvagunta Raju
 Varun
 Baby grand

Soundtrack 

Music composed by Bheems Ceciroleo. Aditya Music Company released the complete soundtrack album featuring three tracks.

References 

2022 films
2022 comedy films
Indian fantasy comedy films
2020s fantasy comedy films
2020s Telugu-language films
Films scored by Bheems Ceciroleo